Harutyunyan, also transliterated as Harutyunian, Haroutunian, Harutiunyan,  or Arutyunyan is an Armenian patronymic surname derived from the given name Harutyun .  The Russified version is Arutyunov. Notable people with the surname include:

Arutiunian
Alexander Arutiunian (1920–2012), Armenian Soviet classical composer and pianist

Arutyunyan
Rafael Arutyunyan (born 1957), American figure skating coach of Armenian descent

Haroutunian
Arto Der Haroutunian (1940–1987), British Armenian cook, artist, translator and writer
Joseph Haroutunian (1904-1968), American Presbyterian theologian
Sophie Haroutunian-Gordon, American Armenian education writers

Harutiunian
Ardashes Harutiunian (1873–1915), Ottoman Armenian poet, translator and literary critic. Used pen-names Manishak, Ban, Shahen-Garo and Garo
Hovhannes Harutiunian (1860–1915), Ottoman Armenian writer and teacher known by his pen name Tlgadintsi

Harutiunyan
Vagharshak Harutiunyan (born 1956), Armenian politician and Defence Minister of Armenia from June 1999 until May 2000

Harutyunyan
Ararat Harutyunyan (born 1975), Armenian footballer
Arayik Harutyunyan (born 1973), Prime Minister of Nagorno-Karabakh
Armen Harutyunyan (born 1964), Armenian lawyer and Judge at the European Court of Human Rights (ECHR)
Artak Harutyunyan (born 1983), Armenian sport wrestler
Artsvik Harutyunyan (born 1984), Armenian singer and songwriter
Davit Harutyunyan (born 1963), Armenian politician
Gagik Harutyunyan (born 1948), Armenian politician and Prime Minister of Armenia
Hasmik Harutyunyan (born 1960), Armenian folk singer
Khosrov Harutyunyan (born 1948), Armenian politician and Prime Minister of Armenia
Kristine Harutyunyan (born 1991), Armenian javelin thrower
Mikael Harutyunyan (born 1946), Armenian general and politician
 Siranush Harutyunyan (born 1987), Armenian singer and songwriter, known professionally as Sirusho
Varazdat Harutyunyan (1909–2008), Armenian academic, architect and writer
Zhora Harutyunyan (1928–2002), Armenian writer and playwright

Armenian-language surnames
Patronymic surnames